"Notorious" is a song by Canadian rock band Loverboy co-written by Jon Bon Jovi. It is the lead track of Wildside, peaking at number 24 and 38 on the Canadian and US charts, becoming the band's last Top 40 single in both countries. The music video was directed by David Fincher through his Propaganda Films company.

Release 
The song debuted at number 91 on August 22, 1987, and stayed there for fourteen weeks. It peaked at number 38 in the week of October 17, 1987. There was also a picture disc release, which features the cover from Wildside. It also peaked at number 8 on the US Rock charts.

Track listing
7" single
 "Notorious" – 4:37
 "Wildside" – 3:32

European 12" single
 "Notorious" – 4:37
 "Wildside" – 3:32
 "Turn Me Loose" – 5:35

UK 12" single
 "Notorious" – 4:37
 "Wildside" – 3:32
 "Turn Me Loose" – 5:35
 "Emotional" – 4:50

Chart performances

References 

1987 songs
1987 singles
Loverboy songs
Song recordings produced by Bruce Fairbairn
Columbia Records singles
Songs written by Jon Bon Jovi
Songs written by Richie Sambora
Songs written by Mike Reno
Songs written by Paul Dean (guitarist)
Songs written by Todd Cerney
Music videos directed by David Fincher